Odveig Klyve (born 29 January 1954) is a Norwegian writer and film director.

Among her notable publications are Rift (poetry debut, 1993), Basunengelen (children's book, 1997), Historien om Null (children's book, 2003), Algebraisk (poetry, 2004), Det andre blikket (poetry, 2006), Sterkest. Historien om Tre (children's book, 2006) and Hemmeleg (children's book, 2007). In total she has published seven poetry collections and eight children's books. She has also translated work of the Iranian poet Forugh Farrokhzād, the Palestinian poet Fadwa Touqan and an English poet.

She has written and directed several short films, which have been invited to international festivals in France, Germany, Spain, Italy, Northern Ireland, England, Scotland, Romania, US and India. She has her education in literature, film and social studies.

She hails from Hardanger and now lives in Stavanger.

References

1954 births
Living people
Norwegian women film directors
Norwegian film directors
20th-century Norwegian poets
Norwegian children's writers
People from Hordaland
Norwegian women poets
Norwegian women children's writers
21st-century Norwegian poets
20th-century Norwegian women writers
21st-century Norwegian women writers
21st-century Norwegian writers